Streptomyces capoamus is a bacterium species from the genus of Streptomyces which has been isolated from soil from Iceland. Streptomyces capoamus produces capomycin, ciclamycin O, ciclamycin 4, anthracycline, ciclacidin A, ciclacidin B and ciclamicin.

See also 
 List of Streptomyces species

References

Further reading

External links
Type strain of Streptomyces capoamus at BacDive – the Bacterial Diversity Metadatabase

capoamus
Bacteria described in 1964